Alligator Bogaloo is an album by jazz saxophonist Lou Donaldson recorded for the Blue Note label in 1967 and featuring Donaldson with Melvin Lastie, Lonnie Smith, George Benson, and Leo Morris (later to be better known as Idris Muhammad).

The success of the title track surprised Donaldson: "[W]e made the date and we were three minutes short. I said we don't have no more material. And the guy said just play anything for three minutes so we can fill out the time. So I just made the riff and naturally the guys could follow it. That's the only damn thing that sold on the record."

Reception 

The album was awarded 4 stars in an Allmusic review by Al Campbell who states "Alligator Bogaloo is one example of Lou Donaldson's successful combinations of hard bop and soul-jazz".

Track listing 
All compositions by Lou Donaldson except as noted
 "Alligator Bogaloo" - 6:57
 "One Cylinder" (Freddie McCoy) - 6:48
 "The Thang" - 3:34
 "Aw Shucks!" (Lonnie Smith) - 7:23
 "Rev. Moses" - 6:27
 "I Want a Little Girl" (Murray Mencher, Billy Moll) - 4:29

Personnel 
 Lou Donaldson - alto saxophone
 Melvin Lastie - cornet (#1-5)
 Lonnie Smith - organ
 George Benson - guitar
 Leo Morris - drums

References 

Lou Donaldson albums
1967 albums
Albums produced by Alfred Lion
Blue Note Records albums
Albums recorded at Van Gelder Studio